The women's 100 metres hurdles event at the 1998 World Junior Championships in Athletics was held in Annecy, France, at Parc des Sports on 1 and 2 August.

Medalists

Results

Final
2 August
Wind: -1.0 m/s

Heats
1 August

Heat 1
Wind: -1.8 m/s

Heat 2
Wind: +0.1 m/s

Heat 3
Wind: -1.3 m/s

Participation
According to an unofficial count, 23 athletes from 17 countries participated in the event.

References

100 metres hurdles
Sprint hurdles at the World Athletics U20 Championships